is a Japanese mental health counselor, radio personality, and former idol. She was a first-generation member of the idol group Nogizaka46.

Career 
In 2006, Nakamoto enrolled in Actor's School Hiroshima as part of the sixteenth batch, joining her sister Suzuka who enrolled in the previous batch the same year. As students, they performed in a duet called Tween. She was also a member of the idol group , which was founded by the school.

Nakamoto passed the auditions for Nogizaka46 on August 21, 2011, and joined as a first generation member. Her audition song was "Aitakatta" by AKB48. She was also the lead vocalist of Nogidan, the rock subunit of Nogizaka46. In the sixth season of NogiBingo!, she served as assistant MC. She was also an assistant MC on the NHK Radio 1 program Radirer! Sunday.

In 2017, Nakamoto went on hiatus from January to early April, citing poor health (later revealed to be a form of adjustment disorder and eating disorder, which she began to experience a few days after joining Nogizaka46). On August 6, she announced in a live broadcast of Radirer! Sunday that she would graduate from Nogizaka46. Her final performance as a Nogizaka46 member took place at the Tokyo Dome on November 7–8, 2017. On November 8, "Last Number", a collaboration single between her and Radio Fish, the boy band formed by Radirer! Sunday hosts Oriental Radio, was released. Her final blog post on the official Nogizaka46 blog was published on December 22, 2017.

Post-Nogizaka46 
Nakamoto became interested in pursuing a mental health care career after she attended psychological counseling sessions while in Nogizaka46. She has completed training as a hand reflexology counselor and in cognitive behavioral therapy, and enrolled into the Faculty of Human Sciences e-School of Waseda University in April 2018. 

On November 20, Nakamoto's official website was launched. She has obtained mental health counselor certification from the Japan Promotion Counselor Association and works as a counselor and trainer while continuing her studies. Like several other former Nogizaka46 members, she is still signed to the Nogizaka46 management and has made public appearances related to her current occupation.

Nakamoto had her own consultation segment on the NHK Hiroshima radio program  from March 2021, and hosts the podcast Himeka Nakamoto's 'Na''' on Nippon Cultural Broadcasting starting June. Her autobiography, Thank You, Me: Graduating from Nogizaka46 and Becoming a Psychological Counselor'', was released on June 22.

Personal life 
Nakamoto is the older sister of Babymetal lead singer and former Sakura Gakuin member Suzuka Nakamoto and the middle child of three sisters. She owns a Yorkshire Terrier named .

Appearances

Radio

Bibliography

References

External links 
Nogizaka46, LLC profile 
Monica and Me Counseling Salon 
 

Nogizaka46 members
Japanese idols
21st-century Japanese women singers
21st-century Japanese singers
J-pop singers
Musicians from Hiroshima
1996 births
Living people
Mental health professionals
Japanese radio personalities